Facundo Vigo González (born May 22, 1999)  is a Uruguayan professional footballer who plays as an attacking midfielder for River Plate in the Uruguayan Primera División.

Club career
Vigo started his career playing with River Plate. He made his professional debut on 5th of December during the 2015/16 season, he played 25 minutes and he did it very well

Honours
Uruguay U20
 South American Games silver medal: 2018

References

1999 births
Living people
Uruguayan footballers
Club Atlético River Plate (Montevideo) players
Association football midfielders
South American Games silver medalists for Uruguay
South American Games medalists in football